Leo is the name of different fictional characters appearing in American comic books published by Marvel Comics.

Publication history
The original Leo first appeared in The Avengers #72 (Jan. 1970), and was created by Roy Thomas and Sal Buscema.

The character subsequently appears in The Avengers #120-123 (Feb.–May 1974), Ghost Rider #7 (Aug. 1974), Iron Man #184 (July 1984), and The West Coast Avengers vol. 2 #26 (Nov. 1987), in which he is killed.

Leo appeared as part of the "Zodiac" entry in The Official Handbook of the Marvel Universe Deluxe Edition #20.

Fictional character biography

Daniel Radford

Daniel Radford is a founding member of the Zodiac, and his base of operations was Los Angeles, California. The Zodiac Cartel was founded by Cornelius van Lunt (Taurus), handpicking the eleven other members; van Lunt concealed his own identity, while he was the only one who knew the identities of the others. Each member was based in a different American city as part of his nationwide criminal network, with the ultimate goal of world economic and political domination.

The Zodiac was infiltrated by Nick Fury, posing as Scorpio; the Zodiac fought the Avengers and escaped. Led by Taurus, the Zodiac later attempted to kill all Manhattan residents born under the sign of Gemini as a show of power, but were thwarted by the Avengers. Taurus's faction attempted to kill the Zodiac dissident faction, but all twelve leaders were captured by the Avengers. A new android version of the Zodiac later appeared, led by Scorpio in a new android body, massacred the human Zodiac, and took over their criminal operations.

Android Leo
An android Leo was a Life Model Decoy created by Scorpio (Jacob Fury) in his "Theatre Of Genetics" to be part of his Zodiac crime organization. Scorpio went after his brother, Nick Fury, with his new group, but was defeated by Defenders and Moon Knight. The Zodiac LMD's were recruited by Quicksilver during his bout with temporary insanity, and Quicksilver ordered the Zodiac LMD's to destroy Avengers for their imagined wrongdoings. The Avengers managed to defeat the group and most were remanded into federal custody.

He arranged the ambush in which the android Zodiac killed all of the remaining human Zodiac leaders except Cornelius van Lunt, alias Taurus. Immediately afterward, Van Lunt sought out the services of the Avengers' West Coast branch to confront and defeat the android Zodiac. In their initial foray, the Avengers failed, although several androids were destroyed. A new Leo LMD helped the Zodiac gain an upper hand when the Avengers tracked the Zodiac to their refuge in Death Valley, California, but the first android Leo took offence at being replaced. He battled Scorpio directly, seemingly destroying him.

The Zodiac Key immediately resurrected the Scorpio LMD. Claiming superiority and believing that the Zodiac would eventually kill the Avengers as the androids could never be stopped, Scorpio wanted to use the Key to transport everyone on the scene to the Key's native dimension where the conflict, he believed, could be prolonged indefinitely. However, when the androids were in the other dimension, they ceased to function because each of them was aligned with a particular zodiacal energy, energy that did not exist in the other dimension. The Avengers found Hawkeye and Tigra had been sent to the same dimension and, reunited, the team was sent back to Earth by the Brotherhood. However, secretly the Brotherhood waited so that someday they could also send the Key to Earth again and create new conflicts for them.

Female android Leo
The female LMD version of Leo was created to look exactly like Tigra to infiltrate the West Coast Avengers alongside the second LMD of Sagittarius, who looked exactly like Hawkeye. The Sagittarius LMD was discovered by Mockingbird, who along with the help of this LMD version of Leo, was destroyed. Leo took part in destroying Sagittarius to maintain her cover. The real Tigra was sent to the Ankh dimension during this time. As the Zodiac LMD's had their final confrontation with West Coast Avengers, it was revealed that the female Leo had infiltrated the group. The male Leo LMD became enraged and attacked Scorpio who had created the duplicate. He destroyed Scorpio only to have the Zodiac key put him back together.

Scorpio transported everyone to the Ankh dimension, hoping to gain an advantage. However, when the androids were in the other dimension, they ceased to function because each of them were aligned with a particular zodiacal energy, energy that did not exist in the other dimension. The Avengers found Hawkeye and Tigra had been sent to the same dimension and, reunited, the team was sent back to Earth by the Brotherhood. However, secretly the Brotherhood waited so that someday they could also send the Key to Earth again and create new conflicts for them.

Ecliptic Leo
Ecliptic Leo was a later addition to the Zodiac who resembled a humanoid lion. As mean, nasty, and brutal as the other Zodiac man-animals, Leo was also a boastful braggart, openly talking of the group’s plans. He accompanied Capricorn and Aries in the theft of Department H's super-organism. He was later killed with the rest of the Zodiac by Weapon X.

Thanos' Leo
The fifth Leo is an unnamed man who Thanos recruited to join his incarnation of the Zodiac. During a fight with Hulk, Leo died of a heart attack and Iron Man used the energy readings on Leo's suit to devise a way to shut down the special suits of the Zodiac members.

Powers and abilities
Leo wore a lion-skin costume equipped with claws on his costume's "paws" as weapons.

The Android Leo has super human strength, agility, endurance, a set of razor sharp claws, enhanced hearing and vision.

The female Android Leo had the same abilities as Tigra.

The Ecliptic Leo possessed superhuman strength, besides using claws and fangs. He wielded a gun and a Zodiac teleportation device.

The fifth Leo is an unnamed man who wears a special suit that enables him to assume the form of a humanoid lion.

In other media
 Leo appears in The Avengers: United They Stand as a leonine alien and member of Zodiac.
 Leo-inspired foot soldiers appear in Ultimate Spider-Man as members of Zodiac.

References

External links
 
 

Articles about multiple fictional characters
Characters created by Roy Thomas
Characters created by Sal Buscema
Comics characters introduced in 1970
Fictional characters from Los Angeles
Fictional gynoids
Marvel Comics female supervillains
Marvel Comics male supervillains
Marvel Comics supervillains